Ivan Pavlov is a 1949 Soviet biopic directed by Grigori Roshal and starring Aleksandr Borisov, Nina Alisova and Nikolai Plotnikov. The film portrays the life of the Russian scientist Ivan Pavlov (1849–1936), known for his Pavlov's dog experiments. The film was made during the Stalinist era, despite the fact that Pavlov had been a noted opponent of the Soviet regime.

Synopsis
The film begins in Ryazan in 1875, and tells about the work of Ivan Pavlov from his first steps in science to sensational discoveries which played a huge role in the development of medicine and psychology.

The young doctor Ivan Pavlov wants to live life "honorably and humanely." The path of the scientist is difficult and thorny. The treasury department does not release funds for research nor give access to animals for experimental use and Pavlov has to buy them on his own savings. The experiments follow one another. Pavlov is pursuing his goal with passion and force. For his work on the physiology of digestion he is awarded the Nobel Prize. Pavlov paves the way for objective studies of brain function in higher animals. Zvantsev, the assistant of Pavlov is an idealist who has become an ideological opponent of the scientist-materialist, implores him not to interfere with the "sanctuary of the spirit", but Pavlov boldly ignores his opponents-obscurantists. The revolutionary 1917 year comes. Pavlov angrily rejects the proposal of an American agent to go abroad; he decides to forever remain with his people in his homeland.

Cast
 Aleksandr Borisov as Ivan Petrovich Pavlov
 Nina Alisova as Varvara Antonovna Ivanova
 Nikolai Plotnikov as Nikodin Vasilyevich 
 Maryana Safonova as Sarafina Pavlova 
 Fyodor Nikitin as Gleb Mikhailovich Zvantsev 
 Grigory Shpigel as Professor Petrushev 
 Vladimir Chestnokov as Lev Zakarich Zabelin 
 Vladimir Balashov as Semenov, student-disciple 
 Ivan Dmitriyev as Dmitri Pavlov 
 Nikolai Cherkasov as Maxim Gorky
 G. Belnikevich as Sergei Mironovich Kirov
 Vasili Sofronov as Arkip Semyonovich Telegin, dying old man 
 Vladimir Soshalsky as student 
 Pavel Pankov as student

References

Bibliography
 Beumers, Birgit. Directory of World Cinema: Russia. Intellect Books, 2011.

External links

1949 films
1940s biographical drama films
1940s historical drama films
Soviet biographical drama films
Soviet historical drama films
Russian biographical drama films
Russian historical drama films
1940s Russian-language films
Films directed by Grigori Roshal
Films set in the 19th century
Films set in the 20th century
Soviet black-and-white films
Films about Nobel laureates
Biographical films about scientists
Lenfilm films
Russian black-and-white films

Films set in the 1870s
Films set in the Russian Empire
Films about scientists